General Clay may refer to:

Cassius Marcellus Clay (politician) (1810–1903), Union Army major general
Cecil Clay (1842–1903), Union Army brevet brigadier general (promoted post-service)
Frank Butner Clay (1921–2006), U.S. Army major general
Green Clay (1757–1828), Kentucky Militia general in the War of 1812
John Granby Clay (1766–1846), British Army general
Lucius D. Clay (1898–1978), U.S. Army general
Lucius D. Clay Jr. (1919–1994), U.S. Air Force general